The National Cyber Security Centre in New Zealand is a branch of the Government Communications Security Bureau. They have been assisting the Waikato District Health Board with the May 2021 attack on their IT systems.

References

External links
National Cyber Security Centre homepage

New Zealand intelligence agencies
New Zealand Public Service departments
Cyberwarfare